Operation Upshot–Knothole was a series of eleven nuclear test shots conducted in 1953 at the Nevada Test Site. It followed Operation Ivy and preceded Operation Castle.

Over 21,000 soldiers took part in the ground exercise Desert Rock V in conjunction with the Grable shot. Grable was a 280mm Artillery Fired Atomic Projectile (AFAP) shell fired from the "Atomic Cannon" and was viewed by a number of high-ranking military officials.

The test series was notable as containing the first time an AFAP shell was fired (GRABLE Shot), the first two shots (both fizzles) by University of California Radiation Laboratory—Livermore (now Lawrence Livermore National Laboratory), and for testing out some of the thermonuclear components that would be used for the massive thermonuclear series of Operation Castle. One primary device (RACER) was tested in thermonuclear system mockup assemblies of TX-14, TX-16, and TX-17/TX-24, to examine and evaluate the behaviour of radiation cases and the compression of the secondary geometries by the primary's x-rays prior to full-scale testing during Castle. Following RACER's dodgy performance, the COBRA primary was used in the emergency capability ALARM CLOCK, JUGHEAD, RUNT I, RUNT II thermonuclear devices, as well as in the SHRIMP device. RACER IV (as redesigned and proof-tested in the Simon test) was employed as primary for the ZOMBIE, RAMROD and MORGENSTERN devices.

List of tests

References
Notes

Citations

Bibliography

 Chuck Hansen, Swords of Armageddon, Version 2 (Chukelea Publications, 1995-2007)

External links 

 Operation Upshot-Knothole
 
 
 
 Operation Upshot-Knothole - 1953
 Film about Upshot Knothole Tests 

Explosions in 1953
Upshot-Knothole
1953 in military history
1953 in Nevada
1953 in the environment
Articles containing video clips